Marseilles-lès-Aubigny is a commune in the Cher department in the Centre-Val de Loire region of France.

Geography
The commune has a small port on the Loire lateral canal.
There is a canal boatyard with dry dock in the basin.
The village grew up because of the canal traffic. The junction of the Canal Lateral a la Loire, a through route from the Channel to the Mediterranean, with the Canal de Berry. The canal de Berry was a small scale canal and goods needed transferring from the larger Freycinet size peniches used on the Canal de Berry to the smaller Berrichon peniches. It ran from this village to join the Loire at Tours.

Population

Sights
 The church, dating from the twentieth century.
 A museum.
 The ruins of a feudal castle.

See also
Communes of the Cher department

References

External links

Official website of Marseilles-lès-Aubigny 

Communes of Cher (department)